The 2011 Úrvalsdeild (also known as the "Pepsi deild" for sponsorship reasons) is the 100th season of top-tier football in Iceland.The season began on 2 May 2011 and concluded on 1 October 2011. Breiðablik are the defending champions, having won their first league championship.

Teams
A total of twelve teams will contest the league, including ten sides from the 2010 season and two promoted teams from the 1. deild karla.

Haukar and Selfoss were relegated from 2010 Úrvalsdeild after finishing the season in the bottom two places of the league table. Both teams were relegated having just achieved promotion the season before.

2010 1. deild karla champions Víkingur R. and runners-up Þór Akureyri secured direct promotion to the Úrvalsdeild.Víkingur returned to the Úrvalsdeild after a three-year absence while Þór return to the top league after an eight-year absence.

League table

Positions by round

Results
Each team play every opponent once home and away for a total of 22 matches.

Top goalscorers

Source ksi.net

References

External links
 Official website 

Úrvalsdeild karla (football) seasons
1
Iceland
Iceland